The Canal de Beaucaire was a canal in southern France.  It is now part of the Canal du Rhône à Sète along with the Canal des Ètangs.  The originator was to be the Marshal de Noailles.  However he did nothing and his concession was revoked.  It was then granted to a company formed by Marshal de Richelieu, but again, nothing was accomplished until the state of Languedoc took over.  Construction was finally begun in 1777 and completed in 1808.  It was to connect the city of Aigues-Mortes to the Rhone.

En Route
 PK 0 Beaucaire
 PK 13.5 Bellegarde
 PK 24.5 Saint-Gilles
 PK 51 Aigues-Mortes

See also
 List of canals in France

References

Beaucaire
Buildings and structures in Gard
Transport in Occitania (administrative region)
Canals opened in 1808